Pempheris rochai, commonly known as Rocha's sweeper, is a species of sweeper fish of the family Pempheridae. It's found in the northern Indian Ocean, on shallow reefs along the coast of Oman.

Etymology
It was named after Luiz A. Rocha to honor his contributions to ichthyology.

References

rochai
Taxa named by John Ernest Randall
Taxa named by Benjamin C. Victor
Fish of the Middle East